Thomas Curtis may refer to:
Thomas Curtis (actor) (born 1991), American actor
Thomas Curtis (athlete) (1870–1944), American athlete and Olympic gold medalist
Sir Thomas Curtis (lord mayor) (died 1559), Lord Mayor of London
Thomas B. Curtis (1911–1993), U.S. Representative from Missouri

See also
Tom Curtis (disambiguation)
Tommy Curtis (1952–2021), American college basketball player
Thomas Curteys, MP for Lostwithiel
Thomas Quinn Curtiss (1915–2000), American writer